Leopoldo López Gil (Caracas, 1944) is a Spanish-Venezuelan politician who was elected as a Member of the European Parliament in 2019.

Political career
López Gil is the father of Venezuelan dissident Leopoldo López. He was granted Spanish citizenship by the Government of Mariano Rajoy in December 2015. He ran 12th in the People's Party (PP) list for the 2019 European Parliament election in Spain in replacement of Ángel Garrido, who renounced to be a PP candidate and went to support Citizens.

López Gil has been a Member of the European Parliament since the 2019 European elections. In parliament, he has since been serving on the Subcommittee on Human Rights. In addition to his committee assignments, he is part of the parliament's delegations to the EU-Chile Joint Parliamentary Committee and to the Euro-Latin American Parliamentary Assembly.

Political positions
In a joint letter with 15 other MEPs from various political groups, López Gil urged the High Representative of the Union for Foreign Affairs and Security Policy Josep Borrell in early 2021 to replace the European Union's ambassador to Cuba for allegedly siding with the country's Communist leadership.

References

Living people
MEPs for Spain 2019–2024
People's Party (Spain) MEPs
1944 births
Leopoldo López